Zoltán Kontár (born 7 November 1993) is a Slovak professional footballer who plays for Swiss club FC Langenthal as a midfielder or defender.

Club career
On 13 July 2015, FK Senica signed Kontár on one year-loan from  FC Petržalka akadémia. At the age of 21, he made his professional debut for FK Senica against FC DAC 1904 Dunajská Streda on 18 July 2015.

References

External links
 FK Senica official profile
 Futbalnet profile
 Eurofotbal profile
 

1993 births
Living people
Slovak footballers
Slovak expatriate footballers
Sportspeople from Dunajská Streda
Hungarians in Slovakia
Association football defenders
FC Petržalka players
FC ŠTK 1914 Šamorín players
FK Senica players
FC DAC 1904 Dunajská Streda players
Gyirmót FC Győr players
Slovak expatriate sportspeople in Hungary
Slovak expatriate sportspeople in Switzerland
Expatriate footballers in Hungary
Expatriate footballers in Switzerland